The following is a list of presidents of the Câmara Municipal de Coimbra (city council), of Coimbra, Portugal.

 Agostinho José Pinto de Almeida, ca. 1834
 José António Rodrigues Trovão, ca. 1834-1835
 Francisco Maria Tavares de Carvalho, ca. 1835-1836
 Joaquim António da Silva, ca. 1836-1837
 José Machado de Abreu, ca. 1837
 António Inácio de Abreu, ca. 1837
 Agostinho José Pinto de Almeida, ca. 1838
 Jerónimo José de Melo, ca. 1839
 Frederico de Azevedo Faro e Noronha, ca. 1840-1841
 António Manuel Pereira, ca. 1841-1842
 José Machado de Abreu, ca. 1843-1844
 Joaquim Inácio Roxanes, ca. 1845-1846
 Joaquim de Castro Henriques, ca. 1846
 Francisco Fernandes da Costa, ca. 1846
 Manuel Marques de Figueiredo, ca. 1847
 António José Cardoso Guimarães, ca. 1847-1851
 Cesário Augusto de Azevedo Pereira, ca. 1852-1855
 António Augusto da Costa Simões, ca. 1856-1857
 Raimundo Venâncio Rodrigues, ca. 1858-1862
 Francisco Fernandes da Costa, ca. 1862
 António Luís de Sousa Henriques Seco, ca. 1863
 D. José Maria de Vasconcelos Azevedo Silva e Carvajal, Visconde Das Canas, ca. 1864-1865
 Manuel Dos Santos Pereira Jardim, Visconde de Montessão, ca. 1866-1867
 Raimundo Venâncio Rodrigues, ca. 1868-1869
 Joaquim Augusto das Neves Barateiro, ca. 1870-1871
 Lourenço de Almeida Azevedo, ca. 1872-1873
 Fernando Augusto de Andrade Pimentel e Melo, ca. 1874-1875
 Lourenço de Almeida Azevedo, ca. 1876-1885 
 João José Dantas Souto Rodrigues, ca. 1886
 Luís da Costa e Almeida, ca. 1887
 Manuel da Costa Alemão, ca. 1890-1892
 João Maria Correia Aires de Campos, ca. 1893-1895
 Luís Pereira da Costa, ca. 1896-1898
 Manuel Dias da Silva, ca. 1899-1904
 José Ferreira Marnoco e Sousa, ca. 1905-1907, 1908
 João Rodrigues Donato, ca. 1908
 Sidónio Bernardino Cardoso da Silva Pais, ca. 1910
 António Augusto Gonçalves, ca. 1911-1913
 José Falcão Ribeiro, ca. 1913
 Francisco Vilaça da Fonseca, ca. 1914-1917
 , ca. 1918
 Augusto Joaquim Alves dos Santos, ca. 1919
 , ca. 1923
 Mário Augusto de Almeida, ca. 1926-1928
 Abel Augusto Dias Urbano, ca. 1928
 João Dos Santos Jacob, ca. 1929-1931
 Afonso José Maldonado, ca. 1931
 Manuel Serras Pereira, ca. 1934
 Luís Wittnich Carrisso, ca. 1935
 Ferrand Pimentel de Almeida, ca. 1935-1941
 Alberto de Sá Oliveira, ca. 1942-1951
 José Maria Correia Cardoso, ca. 1951-1957
 Joaquim de Moura Relvas, ca. 1957-1966
 Júlio de Araújo Vieira, ca. 1966-1974
 Rui Braga Carrington da Costa, ca. 1974-1976
 Maria Judite Pinto de Abreu, ca. 1977-1980
 António Monteiro Dos Santos Moreira, ca. 1980-1983
 Fernando Luís Mendes Silva, ca. 1983-1986
 António Monteiro dos Santos Moreira, ca. 1986-1990
 Manuel Augusto Soares Machado, ca. 1990-2002, 2013-2021(pt)
 , ca.2002-2010
 João Paulo Barbosa de Melo, ca. 2010-2013
 José Manuel Silva, ca. 2021-present

See also
  Coimbra history and timeline
  (municipal magistrates)
 List of bishops of Coimbra

References

This article incorporates information from the Portuguese Wikipedia.

Bibliography
  circa 1860s
  circa 1900s

External links
 

Coimbra
coimbra
Lists of political office-holders in Portugal